Kharwar District is a district of Logar Province, Afghanistan. It was created from Charkh District.

The district, is named after the village of Kharwar (Khawrakay), which is about 56 miles (90 kilometers) south of Kabul and about 40 kilometers northeast of Ghazni.

In July 2008 a coalition helicopter was shot down by small arms fire, an American officer said he was worried about the rising violence in the area.

In 2009 a coalition combat outpost was set up in the district by Cherokee Troop 3-71 CAV 3BCT 10th Mountain Division (LI).  In 2013 the combat outpost was handed over to the Afghan National Army.

Kafir Kot - Archaeological remains

Near the village are a series of archaeological remains known as Kafir Kot (not to be confused with Kafir Kot in Dera Ismail Khan District of Khyber Pakhtunkhwa, Pakistan). These are believed to date from the Kushano-Sassanian period (3rd-7th century AD).

Warwick Ball described Kharwar as "an extensive plain c. 40 km northeast of Ghazni on the route to Charkh-i Logar. Description: ruins of a large town, where many coins have been found." Dr. S M Raheen, the Afghan Minister of Culture and Information has said that "Kharwar is possibly more beautiful than Mes Aynak, almost the same age. Unfortunately looting is going on there, but no one pays any attention … I don't know why everybody cares just about Mes Aynak."

The site is very large — approximately 19 square miles centered on the given coordinates, but never scientifically excavated, so its true size remains unknown— comprising a number of sites and ruins of an immense Buddhist monastery complex or city, where a fortified gate, many stupas, statues and coins have been found.

The site has been looted nearly continuously by locals and organized teams for the past several years. An Italian archaeological team was allowed to visit the site for one day in September, 2003.

All efforts should be made to halt the looting of this site, which archeologists term "the Pompeii of the Buddhist world": meaning a site that was essentially frozen in time, abandoned when the first Islamic armies reached this part of Central Asia during the 8th or 9th century.

Warwick Ball (in Archaeological Gazetteer of Afghanistan, nr 565) located a portion of Kharwar (or Khurwar) at latitude 34º43'N, longitude 68º52'E.

World City Database locates Kharwar at Lat. 33.74, long. 68.8958333

References

Variant Names: Kharvar, Khawrakay, Karfir Kowt, Kefir Kot

Districts of Logar Province